The following lists some of the events from the year 2010 in Russia.

Incumbents
President: Dmitry Medvedev
Prime Minister: Vladimir Putin

Events
Deputies voted to issue the 2010 Kharkiv Pact, a treaty where Russian lease on naval facilities in Crimea would be extended to 2042.
Raspadskaya mine explosion occurred on 8 May 2010.
 In late July 2010, Russian wildfires broke out in Russia. The fires mainly hit European Russia, but they also hit other parts of Russia. In total, the wild fires caused 55790 deaths (54 in wildfires and 55,736 in heat waves).
2010 Chechen Parliament attack took place on October 19. At least six people were killed, including two police officers, one parliament employee and all three suicide commandos. 
2011 Russian Figure Skating Championships took place from December 26–29, 2010, and from February 2–4, 2011. 
2010 World Rhythmic gymnastics Championships took place from September 20 to 26.

Births

Deaths

January

 January 9 - Yevgeny Paladiev, a Soviet-born Kazakh ice hockey player, age 61.
 January 19 - Vladimir Karpov, a Russian writer and Chairman of the USSR Union of Writers (1986–1991), age 87.
 January 24 - Leonid Nechayev, a Russian film director, died of a stroke, age 70.

February

 February 8 - Anna Samokhina, a Russian actress, died from stomach cancer, age 47.

March

 March 18 - Konstantin Yeryomenko, Russian futsal player, died from a heart attack on, age 39.
 March 27 - Vasily Smyslov Russian chess grandmaster and World Champion (1957–1958), died from heart failure, age 89.

April

 April 1 - Yuri Maslyukov, a Russian politician and Vice Premier of Soviet Union (1988–1990) and Russia (1998–1999), age 72.
 April 6 -Anatoly Dobrynin, Russian diplomat and politician, died age 90.
 April 23 - Natalia Lavrova, Olympic gold medalist (2000, 2004), died in a car accident, age 25.

May

 May 30 - Yuri Chesnokov, Russian Olympic gold medal-winning (1964) volleyball player, died age 77.

July

 July 16 - Aleksandr Boloshev, Russian Soviet basketball player, 1972 Olympic gold medalist, died from a stroke, age 63.

September

 September 24 - Gennady Yanayev, Vice President of the USSR (1990–1991), died from lung cancer, age 73.

November

 November 3 - Viktor Chernomyrdin, Prime Minister (1992–1998), died from cancer at age 72.

December

 December 29 - Pavel Kolchin, Russian Olympic gold (1956) and bronze (1956, 1964) medal-winning cross-country skier, died age 80.

See also
List of Russian films of 2010
2010 Russia – United States prisoner swap

References

External links

 
2010s in Russia
Years of the 21st century in Russia